Chase Vincent Malone (born May 25, 1987), more commonly known as Cha Cha Malone, is an American singer, music producer, songwriter, composer, and member of b-boy crew Art of Movement (AOM), from Seattle, Washington. Malone is widely known for his work with Korean-American singer, friend, and fellow AOMG member, Jay Park, which began in 2010 with online hits "Bestie" and "Speechless", and has produced nine tracks for his multi-platinum and award-winning works, Take A Deeper Look and New Breed. In 2011, Malone released an EP, Breakthrough, through iTunes and Bandcamp. Aside from collaborations with Park, Malone has produced and worked with many other artists in South Korea, including Red Velvet, Loona, Cho Seungyoun, Shinhwa, Kara, Dok2, The Quiett, Beenzino, U-KISS, NU'EST, One, B1A4, Baekhyun, and Onew. Malone's distinctive producer tag, the phrase 'I need a cha cha beat boy', is heavily associated with Jay Park's music.

Biography

Early years: B-boying, music production, and illustration
Malone was born in Seattle, Washington, to a Filipino mother and an African-American father. He was raised by his mother and his grandmother also played a huge role in his life.  Malone's first passion was art and illustration, and from a young age this became his creative outlet. At age 7, Malone began playing the piano by ear, and was influenced by his mother, who used to write songs and sing in a band. Malone used to write rap verses in third grade, and was first introduced to the use of modern technology in beat making when he stumbled upon an early version of FL Studio on a friend's computer in 2000, and has participated in online beat battles at Rocbattle. At age 12, and in middle school, Malone entered the world of b-boying with friends at Seattle-based b-boy crew, Art of Movement, and in 2006 he appeared in Season 6 episode 19 of MTV's Made. Malone graduated from The Art Institute of Seattle in 2009, earning a BFA in Media Arts and Animation, and was interested in working in the field of concept art and visual development. Malone found he was always making time to create music during his studies, even when classes were long and homework was draining.

2009–present: Jay Park, Breakthrough, and South Korea
In 2009, Malone sent friend and fellow Art of Movement member, Jay Park, who had recently returned to Seattle from South Korea, a folder of beats to see if he was interested in collaborating. Since then, Malone and Park formed a strong partnership into the producing music and writing songs. In October 2010, the pair's first works were released online; the duet, "Speechless", and Park's single, "Bestie". 2011 saw further successful collaborations between Malone and Park, in which Malone produced four of the seven tracks, including the title track, "Abandoned", on Park's EP, Take A Deeper Look, which went on to win a Golden Disk Award. Also in 2011, Malone produced and wrote his own EP, Breakthrough, with title track, "I Still", a self-inspired and heart-capturing track which Malone calls one of his favourites. Malone hosted Myx TV's Top 10 countdown for a week in 2011. Malone also released "Single Life", which featured Park, as a free download in September 2011.

In 2012, Malone began working with an increasing number of K-pop artists and groups alongside Park, and became a member of production team, Iconic Sounds LLC, who have worked on albums such as The Boys by Girls' Generation, and Only One by BoA. February 2012 saw the release of Park's first studio album, New Breed, in which Malone produced five tracks. The album went multi-platinum with 100,000+ physical sales in South Korea, and peaking at number 1 on the Gaon Album Chart and on international iTunes R&B/Soul charts. Malone and Park produced and wrote "Can't Stop", released in Korean and English, which also featured Park, for Brian Joo's 2012 EP, ReBorn Part 1. Malone and Park also worked together on "4U (For You)" for U-KISS' sixth EP, DoraDora, and on new K-pop girl group Tiny-G's song "Polaris" through South Korea television show, MBC's Music & Lyrics, which starred Jay Park and Lee Si-young. Malone produced three tracks for Park's 2012 mixtape, Fresh Air: Breathe It, including the title track "BODY2BODY", and featured and wrote the track "Hopeless Love". In October 2012, Malone produced "One Love" for South Korean boy band B1A4's 2012 debut Japanese album, 1. 2012 also saw Malone working with American Idol contestant and fellow Seattleite, Mackenzie Thoms.

Discography

Extended plays
 Breakthrough (2011)

Singles
 "Speechless" (2010)
 "I Still" (2011)
 "Single Life" (2011)

Production discography

|-

Awards and nominations

See also
 Art of Movement
 Jay Park discography

References

External links
 
 Iconic Sounds Official Website
 
 
 
 
 MTV Made Season 6 Episode 19

1987 births
Living people
21st-century American composers
21st-century American singers
21st-century American male singers
American breakdancers
American male composers
American male pop singers
American hip hop singers
Filipino people of African-American descent
Musicians from Seattle
Singers from Washington (state)
Songwriters from Washington (state)
21st-century African-American male singers
American male songwriters